The Rogue Valley Terminal Railroad  is a  shortline railroad that connects the industrial park in White City, Oregon, United States to the Central Oregon and Pacific Railroad, which hauls its cars to the Union Pacific Railroad at Eugene, Oregon or Black Butte, California via the Siskiyou Summit, or to the Yreka Western Railroad at Montague, California.

History 
The line began operations in 1951 as a division of the White City Corporation, providing tenants of the new Medford Industrial Park (formerly US Army Cantonment Camp White) with contract rail switching services and a local connection to the Southern Pacific Transportation Company.  The railroad was formally incorporated as an independent common carrier railroad on November 3, 1954 as the White City Terminal & Utilities Co..

In December 1974 the railroad was purchased by the Union Tank Car Company.  Union Tank Car renamed the railroad the WCTU Railway Company effective January 1975.

Berkshire Hathaway gained indirect control of the railroad with the 2008 purchase of Marmon Transportation Services LLC (the parent company of Union Tank Car Company).

On December 17, 2012, Marmon Transportation Services announced the sale of WCTU Railway LLC to RVTR Rail Holdings, a holding company owned by Scott DeVries of Superior, Wisconsin.

On March 15, 2013 the railroad was renamed Rogue Valley Terminal Railroad Corporation, and the holding company owner was renamed the CCT Rail System Corporation.

Operations 
The railroad operates 2 EMD diesel-electric switcher locomotives (only one unit is used at any given time, with the other unit held in reserve).  Operations are conducted Monday through Friday (excluding holidays) with one train crew.

Traffic 
The railroad's main commodities transported are asphalt, cement, chemicals and forest products.

Locomotive Fleet

References 

Oregon railroads
Transportation in Jackson County, Oregon
Switching and terminal railroads
Railway companies established in 1954
American companies established in 1954